Jan Myšák (born 24 June 2002) is a Czech professional ice hockey centre for the Laval Rocket of the American Hockey League (AHL) as a prospect to the Montreal Canadiens of the National Hockey League (NHL). Myšák was drafted 48th overall by the Montreal Canadiens in the 2020 NHL Entry Draft.

Playing career
Myšák was signed by the Hamilton Bulldogs of the Ontario Hockey League (OHL) on 13 January 2020. Before playing in OHL, Myšák played for HC Litvínov and its youth teams. In August 2020, with North American competitions delayed due to the COVID-19 pandemic, he was loaned to HC Litvinov. In the 2020 NHL Entry Draft, Myšák was selected with the 48th overall pick by the Montreal Canadiens. In January 2021, Myšák joined the training camp of the Laval Rocket of the American Hockey League (AHL) after which he made the team and appeared in 13 games, recording two goals.

On 6 April 2021, Myšák signed a three-year, entry-level contract with the Montreal Canadiens. On 1 October 2021, Myšák was cut from Canadiens' training camp and sent down to the Bulldogs.

Career statistics

Regular season and playoffs

International

References

External links
 

2002 births
Living people
Czech ice hockey left wingers
Hamilton Bulldogs (OHL) players
Laval Rocket players
HC Litvínov players
Montreal Canadiens draft picks
People from Litvínov
Sportspeople from the Ústí nad Labem Region
Czech expatriate ice hockey players in Canada